Neodontobutis is a genus of freshwater sleepers native to eastern Asia.

Species
There are currently five recognized species in this genus:
 Neodontobutis aurarmus (Vidthayanon, 1995)
 Neodontobutis hainanensis (W. Chen, 1985)
 Neodontobutis macropectoralis (Đ. Y. Mai, 1978)
 Neodontobutis ngheanensis X. K. Nguyễn & H. D. Nguyễn, 2011
 Neodontobutis tonkinensis (Đ. Y. Mai, 1978)

References

Odontobutidae